Pregnenolone acetate (brand names Antofin, Previsone, Pregno-Pan), also known as pregn-5-en-3β-ol-20-one 3β-acetate, is a synthetic pregnane steroid and an ester of pregnenolone which is described as a glucocorticoid and as a skin-conditioning and skin anti-aging agent. It has been reported to reduce wrinkles in elderly women when applied in the form of a 0.5% topical cream, effects which were suggested to be due to improved hydration of the skin. Pregnenolone acetate has been marketed in France in a topical cream containing 1% pregnenolone acetate and 10% "sex hormone" for the treatment of premature skin aging but was withdrawn from the market in 1992. Although the medication has been described by some sources as a glucocorticoid, other authors have stated that systemic pregnenolone acetate has no undesirable metabolic or toxic effects even at high doses.

See also
 Pregnenolone succinate
 Prebediolone acetate

References

Abandoned drugs
Acetate esters
Steroid esters
Glucocorticoids
Ketones
Pregnanes
Prodrugs